Peter Blair Denis Bernard Noone (born 5 November 1947) is an English singer-songwriter, guitarist, pianist and actor.  He was the lead singer "Herman" in the 1960s pop group Herman's Hermits.

Early life
Noone was born in Davyhulme, Lancashire, England, the second of five children, the son of an accountant, and attended English Martyrs (Urmston), Wellacre Primary School (Flixton), Stretford Grammar School, and St Bede's College, Manchester.

Noone played a number of acting roles on television, including that of Stanley Fairclough in the soap opera Coronation Street. Noone studied voice and drama at the Manchester School of Music, where he won the Outstanding Young Musician Award.

Career

Herman's Hermits
Early in his career, he used the stage name Peter Novac. At 15, he became the lead singer, spokesman and frontman of Herman's Hermits, who were discovered by Harvey Lisberg. As "Herman", the photogenic Noone appeared on the cover of many international publications, including Time Magazine's collage showing new faces in popular music. The Hermits consisted of Noone, Derek “Lek” Leckenby and Keith Hopwood (guitars), Karl Green (bass) and Barry Whitwam (drums).

The band's hits included:  "I'm into Something Good", "Can't You Hear My Heartbeat", "Mrs. Brown, You've Got a Lovely Daughter", "Silhouettes", "Wonderful World", "I'm Henry the Eighth, I Am" (in the U.S.), "There's a Kind of Hush", "Just a Little Bit Better", "A Must to Avoid", "Listen People", "The End of the World", "Dandy", and "No Milk Today". Herman's Hermits sold more than 60 million records and had 14 gold singles and seven gold albums. The Hermits were twice named in the U.S. trade paper Cashbox as "Entertainer of the Year".

As Herman, Noone performed on hundreds of television programmes and appeared with the Ed Sullivan, Jackie Gleason, Dean Martin and Danny Kaye television programs. He starred in ABC's musical version of The Canterville Ghost, Hallmark Hall of Fame's presentation of the classic Pinocchio (in which he played the title role), and three feature films for MGM: Mrs. Brown, You've Got A Lovely Daughter, Hold On! and When The Boys Meet The Girls.

They were the opening act of the 1970 Royal Variety Performance from the London Palladium performing a medley of their hits to date followed by their rendition of If I Were a Rich Man, Where is Love? and Old Henry's Fish and Chips. They ended with their recent hit There's a Kind of Hush.

Solo work
After Herman's Hermits disbanded in 1971, Noone recorded four singles for UK RAK Records, one single for UK and US Philips, and several singles for the small UK record label, Bus Stop Records. His first RAK single, "Oh! You Pretty Things", peaked at No.12 in the UK Singles Chart and No. 100 in Australia. It was written by David Bowie, who also played piano on the track. In 1973, Noone made a guest appearance on The Sonny & Cher Comedy Hour television show. In 1974, Noone scored a No. 15 US AC, No. 101 US Bubbling Under, and No. 33 Canadian AC() success with "Meet Me on the Corner Down at Joe's Cafe" on the Casablanca Records label. Earlier in the year, his "(I Think I'm Over) Getting Over You" had reached No. 63 in the Canadian AC charts. In 1989 he had a No. 19 US AC hit with his solo recording of Goffin and King's "I'm into Something Good" from the film The Naked Gun: From the Files of Police Squad!. In the 1980s, Noone released a solo album, One of the Glory Boys. Noone appeared as Frederic in Joe Papp's Broadway, London, US tour and international touring productions of The Pirates of Penzance. He also appeared in the touring company of Romance/Romance.

The Tremblers
Noone led a short-lived group called the Tremblers that toured in 1980 and released one album, Twice Nightly. Along with Noone, the members of the band were Greg Inhofer (keyboards), Robert Williams (drums, formerly with the Pop), George Conner (lead guitar), and Mark Browne (bass). According to the liner notes of the album, several musicians provided "licks & tricks," including members of Tom Petty's Heartbreakers, Elton John's backing band, Daryl Dragon, Phil Seymour and Dave Clark. Modern Recording magazine reviewed the album negatively, saying the music bogged down in "power pop careening into bubblegum" songs that were not different enough from each other: adolescent lyrics delivered at the same fast tempo, recorded with an uninteresting, barely stereo sound field. The album was said to represent a throwback to "the worst of the British Invasion groups" of 15 years earlier.

SiriusXM
, Noone has a programme on SiriusXM's 60s Gold station titled "Something Good" after Herman's Hermits' hit song, "I'm into Something Good".

Herman's Hermits revived
Since the 1980s, Noone has performed under the name Herman's Hermits starring Peter Noone.

Personal life
Noone married Mireille Strasser on 5 November 1968, his twenty-first birthday, and has one daughter, Natalie.

References

External links
 Official website
 
 
 Peter Noone singing his daughter's song 

1947 births
Living people
English expatriates in the United States
English male singers
Male actors from Manchester
Musicians from Manchester
People from Davyhulme
People educated at St Bede's College, Manchester
Herman's Hermits members
Rak Records artists
Beat musicians